In 1938 Walter D. Scott founded WD Scott & Co in Sydney, which by the 1960s had grown to become one of the largest management consultancy firms in Australia.  The company specialized in business process improvement and performance improvement.  In 1966, Sir Walter Scott was appointed as the Chair of the Decimal Currency Board by the Prime Minister, and WDScott (now one word without a space) was appointed to oversee the implementation of decimal currency in Australia.

At one point WDScott existed in many countries and regions around the globe, including Australia, New Zealand, Europe, Asia, the United Kingdom, and the United States.
 Australia: In 1985 WDScott merged with Coopers & Lybrand and spent 20 years as part of what is now PwC—In 2004 WDScott was bought back from PwC, re-established and re-launched as a separate brand in Australia, and in 2007 was incorporated as WDScott Ltd (see below).
 New Zealand: By 1986 WDScott had merged with DH&S
 United Kingdom: WDScott continued as a separate brand until 2013 .

In 2007 WDScott re-launched the brand under WDScott Ltd, a public unlisted Australian corporation, with a new international board and a management team to lead the firm.  The WDScott methodology and knowledge suite were re-vitalised and re-established within international academic and business communities.  The firm acquired Australian management consultancy Clear Lead Pty Ltd in December 2007, and subsequently made several other mergers and acquisitions, including Global Justice Solutions.

In 2010, WDScott merged with Distinct Consulting, an Ireland-based firm with expertise in the design and implementation of business intelligence and analytics-based solutions.  The firm expanded to Australia, Europe, and the US.

In 2013, WDScott's northern hemisphere business was acquired by multi-national firm FTI Consulting.  FTI also bought the rights to the Distinct brand.  The WDScott brand was retained by the Australian business.

Today, WDScott operates as an Australian Pty Ltd company with offices in Sydney, Melbourne, Brisbane, and Canberra.

External links
http://wdscott.com
http://wdscott.com/who-we-are
http://wdscott.com/our-difference

Australian businesspeople
Consulting firms established in 1938
Australian companies established in 1938